Mary Lambert Gary (born October 13, 1951) is an American director.  She has directed music videos, television episodes and feature films, mainly in the horror genre.

Life and career
Lambert was born in Helena, Arkansas, the daughter of Martha Kelly and Jordan Bennett Lambert III, a rice and cotton farmer. Her younger sister is former U.S. Senator Blanche Lincoln of Arkansas. Lambert graduated from the Rhode Island School of Design with a B.F.A.

Lambert directed Chris Isaak's first music video "Dancin'" and Janet Jackson's "Nasty" and "Control" music videos.  She also directed videos for Annie Lennox, Mick Jagger, The Go-Go's, Whitney Houston, Alison Krauss, Live, Mötley Crüe, Queensrÿche, Sting, Debbie Harry, Tom Tom Club and others. She directed many of Madonna's early videos including "Borderline", "Like a Virgin", "Material Girl", "La Isla Bonita", and "Like a Prayer".

In 1987, she released her first feature film, the stylish and controversial Siesta, starring Ellen Barkin and Jodie Foster.  It was nominated for the IFP Spirit Award for Best First Feature, losing to Dirty Dancing. She is known to horror fans for directing the 1989 adaptation of Stephen King's novel Pet Sematary and its sequel, Pet Sematary Two. More recently, Lambert directed 2005's Urban Legends: Bloody Mary and the 2011 Syfy horror film Mega Python vs. Gatoroid.

She directed the 1993 Digital Pictures FMV video game Double Switch.

Personal life 
She is married to Jerome Gary.

Filmography

Film

Television

Music videos

Video games

References

External links

1951 births
American music video directors
American television directors
American women film directors
Female music video directors
American women television directors
Horror film directors
Living people
People from Helena, Arkansas
Rhode Island School of Design alumni
Film directors from Arkansas